Te Whatu Ora is a public health agency established by the New Zealand Government to replace the country's 20 district health boards (DHBs) on 1 July 2022. Te Whatu Ora is charged with working alongside the Public Health Agency and Te Aka Whai Ora (the Māori Health Authority) to manage the provision of healthcare services in New Zealand. Margie Apa was appointed chief executive of Te Whatu Ora in December 2021.

Mandate and responsibilities 
Te Whatu Ora is responsible for the planning and commissioning of health services as well as the functions of the 20 former district health boards. The Ministry of Health will remain responsible for setting health policy, strategy and regulation. Te Whatu Ora also works with the Te Aka Whai Ora (the Māori Health Authority) to improve Māori health outcomes and services.

As of 2022, the agency is New Zealand's largest employer, consolidating the DHBs' combined work force of 80,000, with an estimated annual operating budget of NZ$20 billion and an asset base of about NZ$24 billion.

Leadership and structure
Te Whatu Ora is headed by Chief Executive Margie Apa and Nick Chamberlain, the National Director of the National Public Health Service. The organisation's board members include former National Party Member of Parliament Amy Adams, Tipa Mahuta, Karen Poutasi, Vanessa Stoddart, and Medical Council of New Zealand Chair Curtis Walker. Economist Rob Campbell was formerly chair of the board, but was removed from this position on 28 February 2023 by Minister of Health Dr Ayesha Verrall following public comments Campbell made about co-governance which were deemed to be non-politically neutral.

Health New Zealand consists of four regional divisions, with regional commissioning boards overseeing the provisioning of primary and community health services, in coordination with the Māori Health Authority. These four new regional divisions consist of:
Northern: Northland Region, Waitematā, Auckland and Counties Manukau;
Te Manawa Taki: Waikato, Lakes, Bay of Plenty, Tairāwhiti, Taranaki;
Central: MidCentral, Whanganui, Capital & Coast/Hutt Valley, Hawke's Bay, Wairarapa;
Te Waipounamu: Canterbury Region, West Coast Region, Nelson Marlborough, Southern, and South Canterbury. 

As the successor to the district health boards, Health New Zealand is responsible for running all hospitals and health services including the DHB's 12 public health units and the former Health Promotion Agency. These public health units dealt with areas such as drinking water, infectious disease control, tobacco, and alcohol control.

History

Announcement
On 21 April 2021, Minister of Health Andrew Little announced plans to replace the country's 20 district health boards with a new public health agency called "Health New Zealand", which would be modelled after the United Kingdom's National Health Service. Health New Zealand would work alongside the new Māori Health Authority, which is now responsible for setting Māori health policies and overseeing the provision of Māori health services. In addition, a Public Health Authority was established to centralise public health work.

The National Party's health spokesperson Shane Reti criticised the government's plan to replace the district health boards with a new centralised agency. He claimed that centralisation took away autonomy from local regions and suggested that the government instead explore the consolidation of some functions such as asset management across the DHBs rather than abolishing them entirely. Reti claimed that the public was unaware of the cost of the government's planned restructuring and the potential disruption it would cause.

Formation
In mid-September 2021, the government announced the interim board members of Health New Zealand. The agency will be chaired by Rob Campbell. Other board members include Sharon Shea (co-chair of the interim Māori Health Authority and current chair of the Bay of Plenty District Health Board), former National MP Amy Adams, chartered accountant and lawyer Cassandra Crowley, former Labour Member of Parliament Mark Gosche, former Director General of Health Karen Poutasi, senior executive Vanessa Stoddart, and general practitioner and kidney specialist Curtis Walker.

On 19 May 2022, the government allocated NZ$13.2 billion to facilitate the establishment of the Health New Zealand and the Māori Health Authority over the next four years. This amount included $11.1 billion to address the cost pressures of the previous district health board system and $2.1 billion to set up the two new health entities.

In October 2021, the government introduced the Pae Ora (Healthy Futures) Bill which formally entrenched various health reforms including the replacement of the district health board system with Health New Zealand. The bill passed its third reading on 7 June 2022.

Launch
On 1 July 2022, Te Whatu Ora formally launched, with the new entity assuming responsibility for all hospitals and health services formerly run by the district health boards. In addition, the 12 public health units, which operated within the DHBs, and the former Health Promotion Agency were transferred into Te Whatu Ora. The new entity also assumed the commissioning functions of the Health Ministry and the commissioning and delivery functions of the DHBs.

Criticism 
In mid August, Radio New Zealand reported that Health New Zealand lacked Asian members on the organisation's 51 leadership roles despite Asians making up 15% of New Zealand's population according to the 2018 New Zealand census. Population and migration researcher Dr Francis Collins advocated legislation ensuring greater minority representation in leadership and decision-making. Asian medical professionals Doctor Carlos Lam and Vishal Niwi of the Asian Network criticised the lack of Asian representation and input within Health New Zealand's leadership. In response, Health NZ's chief executive Margie Apa claimed that the organisation was committed to diversity in its workforce but admitted they had not set targets for representation on the grounds that its employees and management were required to serve all communities equitably. 

In late August 2022, Health NZ was criticised by the opposition National Party's health spokesperson Shane Reti for abandoning the previous district health boards' practice of holding public monthly meetings. Health NZ has closed its meetings to the public and media, releasing only brief summaries of its board meetings. The organisation's chair Rob Campbell defended the decision to exclude the public and media from its initial board meetings on the grounds that they dealt with sensitive issues such as staff appointments and Cabinet decisions. Campbell and chief executive Margie Apa held half-an-hour media briefings following board meetings to discuss the contents of their meetings with the media.

References

External links

2022 establishments in New Zealand
Health care in New Zealand
Medical and health organisations based in New Zealand
New Zealand public service departmental agencies